The 1978 Barnet Council election took place on 4 May 1978 to elect members of Barnet London Borough Council in London, England. The whole council was up for election and the Conservative party stayed in overall control of the council.

Background
Since the last election in 1974, the Local Government Boundary Commission carried out their first periodic electoral review of Barnet under the Local Government Act 1972 and made a number of boundary changes.

Election result
Overall turnout in the election was 43.6%.

|}

Ward results

Arkley

Brunswick Park

Burnt Oak

Childs Hill

Colindale

East Barnet

East Finchley

Edgware

Finchley

Friern Barnet

Garden Suburb

Golders Green

Hadley

Hale

Hendon

Mill Hill

St Paul's

Totteridge

West Hendon

Woodhouse

By-elections between 1978 and 1982

Hadley

The by-election was called following the death of Cllr. Ernest A. E. Asker.

References

1978
1978 London Borough council elections
Election and referendum articles with incomplete results